Nick Hampton (born April 5, 2000) is an American college football outside linebacker for the Appalachian State Mountaineers.

Early life and high school career
Hampton grew up in Anderson, South Carolina and attended Westside High School. He had 63 tackles, 16 for loss, and seven sacks in his junior season. Hampton committed to play college football at Appalachian State.

College career
Hampton played in three games as a true freshman while maintaining a redshirt on the season. He made 42 tackles with three sacks during his redshirt freshman season. As a redshirt junior, Hampton was named third team All-Sun Belt Conference after finishing the season with 69 tackles, 17.5 tackles for loss, and 11 sacks.

References

External links
Appalachian State Mountaineers bio

Living people
Players of American football from South Carolina
American football linebackers
Appalachian State Mountaineers football players
2000 births